A pistol is a small handheld firearm. It may also refer to:

Arts and entertainment
 Ancient Pistol, a character in several of Shakespeare's plays
 Pistol (film), a 1973 Swedish film
 Pistol (miniseries), a miniseries about the band Sex Pistols
 The Pistol (EP)
 A bid in some variants of the dominoes game 42

People
 Ion Pistol, Romanian executed for murder
 "Pistol" Pez Whatley (1951–2005), American professional wrestler

Other uses
 Pistol River, Oregon, United States
 Pistol Bay, Nunavut, Canada
 Pistol offense, an offensive strategy in American football
 Pistol squat, variant of lower body exercise used in strength training
 Magnetic pistol, on a naval mine or torpedo, fuze for detonation by a nearby magnetic mass
 Aerial bomb fuze

See also
 Pistol Star, a blue hypergiant star in the Milky Way galaxy
 Pistil, part of a flower
 Pistole, a type of coin
 Pistol Pete (disambiguation), nickname and fictional character name
 Gun (disambiguation)